The 1898 Illinois Fighting Illini football team was an American football team that represented the University of Illinois during the 1898 Western Conference football season.  In their fourth season under head coach George Huff, the Illini compiled a 4–5 record and finished in fourth place in the Western Conference. Fullback Arthur R. Johnston was the team captain.

Schedule

Roster

References

Illinois
Illinois Fighting Illini football seasons
Illinois Fighting Illini football